The  class was the last class of battlecruisers to be built by Germany in World War I. The design initially called for seven ships, but three of them were redesigned as the . The lead ship of the class was named for August von Mackensen, a prominent military commander during the war. In response to the -class ships, the British Royal Navy laid down the s, all but one of which would eventually be cancelled; the sole survivor, was completed after the end of the war.

The design of the s was a much improved version of the previous . The most significant improvement was a new, more powerful  gun, compared to the  gun of the earlier ships. The -class ships also featured more powerful engines that gave the ships a higher top speed and a significantly greater cruising range. The  design provided the basis for the subsequent  class, armed with  main-battery guns, after the Battle of Jutland in 1916 made the need for the larger guns clear.

Design 
The fourth and final Naval Law, passed in 1912, governed the building program of the German navy during World War I. The Imperial Naval Office decided the Navy should construct one battleship and one battlecruiser every year between 1913 and 1917, with an additional unit of both types in 1913 and 1916. Design work on the new class began in 1912, with construction intended to begin in the 1914 budget year. The question about the main battery for the new battlecruisers was the most pressing; the previous  was armed with  guns, though some consideration had been given to redesigning the last two ships— and —with  guns.

The 35 cm guns were heavier than the 30.5 cm guns, and there were problems with enlarging the new ships to accommodate the heavier armament. This meant that an increase in displacement would necessitate a longer and wider hull to keep any increases in draft minimal and avoid reducing the speed. The constraints on enlarging the hull were compounded by restrictions on width imposed by the locks of the canal in Wilhelmshaven.

The design staff suggested using triple or even quadruple gun turrets to keep the displacement under the 30,000-ton limit. Another suggested alternative was to use six 38 cm (15 in) guns in twin turrets, one forward and two aft; Wilhelm II accepted that design on 2 May 1913, though  Friedrich von Ingenohl, the commander in chief of the High Seas Fleet, preferred the 30.5 cm gun of the -class ships. As a compromise, the new battlecruisers were to be armed with eight 35 cm (13.8 inch) guns.

The question of whether the new ships should be powered entirely by oil-fired boilers was less controversial. The design staff was generally in agreement with the standard practice of using coal-fired boilers for two-thirds of the power plant, with the remainder being oil-fired boilers. Coal-fired boilers were preferred because the coal, stored in the sides of the ship, provided additional protection, particularly for the battlecruisers, which carried less armor than their battleship counterparts. The finalized design was approved on 23 May 1914.

General characteristics 

The ships were designed to displace  on a standard load, and up to  fully laden. The s hulls were composed of longitudinal steel frames, over which the outer hull plates were riveted. This was the same type of construction as in the preceding -class battlecruisers, and was intended to save weight compared to the traditional method of construction, which incorporated both longitudinal and transverse frames. The ships' hulls contained 18 watertight compartments and a double bottom that ran for 92 percent of the length of the hull. This was significantly greater than the older -class ships, which had a double bottom for only 65 percent of the length of the hull.

Experience with previous battlecruiser designs led to the adoption of a continuous upper deck, which raised the level of the deck aft. This was necessary because the aft decks of earlier designs were usually awash when steaming at high speed, even in calm seas. The ships were also equipped with a bulbous bow to reduce drag on the hull, the first time the feature was used in the German Navy. The ships as designed required a crew of 46 officers and 1,140 enlisted sailors. Service as a squadron flagship would increase that number by an additional 14 officers and 62 sailors. The vessels carried a number of small boats, including two picket boats, one barge, two launches, two cutters, and three yawls.

Machinery 
The ships had 24 coal-fired marine-type single ended boilers and eight oil-fired marine-type boilers. The power plants were designed to provide  and 295 revolutions per minute. The ships were equipped with a pair of rudders mounted side by side, as opposed to the tandem rudders used on the -class ships.

The ships' turbines were equipped with Föttinger gears, which significantly improved performance at cruising speeds and provided a corresponding increase in range of about 20 percent. Electrical power on the vessels was provided by eight diesel generators that put out 2,320 kilowatts at 220 volts.

Armament 

The s were equipped with a main battery of eight new 35 cm SK L/45 guns in four twin gun turrets. The turrets were mounted in superfiring pairs fore and aft of the main superstructure. The guns were placed in Drh LC/1914 mountings, which could elevate to 20 degrees and depress to −5 degrees. The guns were supplied with a total of 720 armor-piercing shells, or 90 per gun. The weapons were designed to fire 600 kg (1,323 lb) shells at a rate of fire of around 2.5 shots per minute. As with other heavy German guns, these weapons used a fore propellant charge in a silk bag with a main charge in a brass case.

The ships' secondary battery consisted of fourteen 15 cm (5.9 in) SK L/45 quick-firing guns mounted in armored casemates along the central superstructure. The guns had a sustained rate of fire of 7 rounds per minute. The shells were 45.3 kg (99.8 lb), and were loaded with a 13.7 kg (31.2 lb) RPC/12 propellant charge in a brass cartridge. The guns fired at a muzzle velocity of 835 meters per second (2,740 ft/s). The guns were expected to fire around 1,400 shells before they needed to be replaced.

The ships were also armed with eight 8.8 cm (3.45 in) L/45 Flak guns in single pedestal mounts. Four were arranged around the rear superfiring main battery turret and the other four around the forward conning tower. The Flak guns were emplaced in MPL C/13 mountings, which allowed depression to −10 degrees and elevation to 70 degrees.

As was standard for warships of the period, the s were equipped with submerged torpedo tubes. There were five  tubes: one in the bow, and two on each flank of the ship.

Armor 
The Mackensen-class ships were protected with Krupp cemented steel armor, as was the standard for German warships of the period. Specific figures for the arrangement of the armor layout have not survived, but according to naval historian Erich Gröner "The outfit of Krupp armour was similar to that of the [preceding] Derfflinger class". The figures listed here are those for the Derfflinger class. They had an armor belt of  thickness in the central citadel of the ship, where the most important parts of the vessel were located. This included the ammunition magazines and the machinery spaces. The belt was reduced in less critical areas, to  forward and  aft. A  torpedo bulkhead ran the length of the hull, several meters behind the main belt.

The 15 cm guns had 150 mm worth of armor plating in the casemates; the guns themselves had  shields to protect their crews from shell splinters.

Construction and cancellation 

 
Seven ships were originally planned in the class: Mackensen, Graf Spee, Prinz Eitel Friedrich, "A"/Ersatz Friedrich Carl, and three other vessels. The first two ships were ordered on 14 August 1914, shortly after the outbreak of World War I. Mackensen was funded through the 1914 budget, while funding for Graf Spee came from the war budget. Mackensen—ordered under the provisional name Ersatz Victoria Louise, as a replacement for the old protected cruiser —was named after Generalfeldmarschall (Field Marshal) August von Mackensen. The ship was laid down on 30 January 1915 at Blohm & Voss in Hamburg, under construction number 240. She was launched on 21 April 1917; at the small launching ceremony, Generaloberst (Colonel General) Josias von Heeringen gave the speech and the ship was christened by Mackensen's wife. Construction was halted about 15 months before she would have been completed. The British mistakenly believed the ship to have been completed, and so they included the ship on the list of vessels to be interned at Scapa Flow instead of the fleet flagship . Mackensen was stricken from the German navy, according to the terms of the Treaty of Versailles, on 17 November 1919. She was sold for scrap and eventually broken up in 1922 at Kiel-Nordmole.

Graf Spee was named for Vice Admiral Maximilian von Spee, the commander of the German East Asia Squadron; he was killed when his squadron was annihilated at the Battle of the Falkland Islands in 1914. Graf Spee was laid down on 30 November 1915 in the Schichau yards in Danzig (now Gdańsk, Poland), under the provisional name Ersatz Blücher, to replace the large armored cruiser  that had been sunk at the Battle of Dogger Bank in January 1915. She was launched on 15 September 1917. At the launching ceremony, Großadmiral Prince Heinrich gave the speech and Spee's widow Margarete christened the ship. Construction stopped about 12 months away from completion; Graf Spee was the furthest along of all four ships when work was halted. She too was struck on 17 November 1919; on 28 October 1921 the unfinished hull was sold for 4.4 million Marks and broken up in Kiel-Nordmole.

Prinz Eitel Friedrich, ordered as Ersatz Freya (a replacement for ) was named for one of Kaiser Wilhelm II's sons, Eitel Friedrich. She was laid down on 1 May 1915 at Blohm & Voss under construction number 241. She was 21 months away from completion when she was launched to clear the slip on 13 March 1920 and was broken up at Hamburg in 1921. At the launching ceremony, dockyard workers named the ship Noske, after Reichswehr Minister Gustav Noske. "A"/Ersatz Friedrich Carl, which might have been named Fürst Bismarck for the famous German chancellor Otto von Bismarck, and ordered as a replacement for SMS Friedrich Carl, was laid down on 3 November 1915 at the Wilhelmshaven Imperial Shipyard under construction number 25. She was about 26 months from completion when work ended. She was never launched; instead, the vessel was broken up on the slip in 1922.

Experience at the Battle of Jutland led the RMA to conclude that ships with 38 cm guns, heavier armor, and a higher top speed were necessary. The Mackensen design was used as the basis for the Ersatz-Yorck class, which incorporated the larger guns and more armor for the main battery turrets and barbettes. More powerful engines were unavailable to compensate for the extra weight, so the designers were forced to accept a reduced speed. Nevertheless, like the Mackensens, the three ships ordered under the Ersatz-Yorck design were never completed. Three of the four Admiral-class ships were cancelled; only  was completed after the end of the war.

The primary reason construction halted on the four ships was the shifting of construction materials and manpower from capital ships to U-boats in the last two years of the war. The RMA filed a report dated 1 February 1918 stating that capital ship construction had ground to a halt primarily for this reason. Some thought was given to convert all four of the ships into dry grain carriers after the war, but the proposals ultimately came to nothing.

Notes

Footnotes

Citations

References

Further reading
 
 

Battlecruiser classes
 
Proposed ships of Germany
Cancelled ships